Caroline Todd is the name of:

 Caroline and Charles Todd, American mystery novelists
 Caroline Todd (Green Wing character), a character in the British sitcom Green Wing